Ilkka Heikkilä (born July 1, 1988) is a retired Finnish ice hockey centre.

Career
Heikkilä began his playing career with JYP, playing in their various junior teams at U16, U18 and U20 level but never managed to play for their senior team. During this, he played in the 2006 IIHF World U18 Championships for Finland where they claimed a silver medal, losing in the final to the United States.

Heikkilä went on to play a total of 216 games in Finland's second-tier league Mestis, playing for Titaanit, SaPKo, D Team, Hokki and IPK.

On August 17, 2018, Heikkilä became team manager of IPK which ended his playing career.

References

External links

1988 births
Living people
Finnish ice hockey centres
Hokki players
Iisalmen Peli-Karhut players
JYP-Akatemia players
SaPKo players